Rabbi (Heb., leader, teacher, master, director; variously rav, rebbe, etc.) is an honorific title used by his followers to refer to any rabbi. But some rabbis have achieved such fame that they are widely called rabbi even by people not their followers.

People called Rabbi
 Yochanan ben Zakkai, sage of the first century CE and probably the first to be called "rabbi".
 Jesus of Nazareth was often called "Rabbi" in the Gospels of Matthew and Mark while in John he is also called "Rabboni" ("our rabbi").
 John the Baptist was called "Rabbi" by his disciples in 
 Judah HaNasi (c. 135 to 217)
 Mose Solomon (1900-1966), the "Rabbi of Swat", American Major League Baseball player

People called Rabbah
 Rabbah bar Nahmani (c.270 – c.330)

People called Rabenu

 Moses
 Judah HaNasi
 Gershom ben Judah
 Moses Maimonides

People called Rav

 Abba Arika (175–247)

People called the Rav or haRav

 Obadiah ben Abraham (15th century)
 Shneur Zalman of Liadi (1745–1812)
 Joseph B. Soloveitchik (1903–1993)

People called Rava
 Abba ben Joseph bar Ḥama (c. 280–352)

People called Mar (master, mister)

 Mar bar Rav Ashi (fl. 455, d. 467), son of Rabbi Ashi
 Mar Ukva

People called Maran (our master)

 Yosef Karo (1488–1575)

See also
 List of rabbis